Chicken Picasso is a chicken dish named after painter Pablo Picasso, and supposed to have been created by him. It consists of roasted chicken served with tomatoes, basil and olives.

References

Chicken dishes
Pasta dishes
Cultural depictions of Pablo Picasso
Spanish cuisine